Felidae is a 1994 German adult animated mystery film directed by Michael Schaack, written by Martin Kluger, Stefaan Schieder and Akif Pirinçci, and based on Pirinçci's 1989 novel of the same name. Produced by Trickompany, the film features the voices of Ulrich Tukur, Mario Adorf and Klaus Maria Brandauer. The story centers on domestic house cat Francis and the grisly feline murders taking place in his new neighborhood.

Plot 
Francis, an intelligent and cynical cat, is moved to a gloomy, dilapidated house with his owner Gustav Löbel, a romance writer and archeologist. The top floor of the house gives off a mysterious and distinctly chemical odor. During Francis's exploratory tour of the house, he discovers the body of a cat who was killed by a bite to the neck. At the crime scene, he meets and befriends Bluebeard, a foul-mouthed, one-eyed and mutilated Maine Coon. Soon, Francis discovers another body and the fact that his house's top floor is the meeting site of a sect of cats led by Joker; the members of the sect worship an entity named Claudandus and perform ritualistic suicide by throwing themselves in an electric current. When Francis's cover is blown, he is chased by the sect members through the city's rooftops. He escapes through a skylight and meets a blind cat named Felicity, who supplies Francis with information on the Claudandus sect.

The next day, Bluebeard takes Francis to Pascal, an elderly and tech-savvy cat who has taken to meticulously maintaining a list of feline deaths in the area, through which Francis learns that Felicity is the latest victim. That night, Francis is haunted by a nightmare in which the famous friar and geneticist Gregor Mendel leaves him with riddles. During a rodent hunt, Francis discovers a video recording that documents the top floor's previous use as an experimental laboratory; this laboratory was devoted to the research and development of a fibrin glue and tissue adhesive that would close wounds in an instant. The test subjects largely consisted of stray cats that, more often than not, died in agony as a result of the failed test runs. The one cat who survived the experiments was christened by the lab's technicians as "Claudandus", Latin for "He who should or must be sealed". However, Claudandus eventually murdered the project's alcoholic and increasingly unhinged lead technician Dr. Preterius, leading to the escape of the other strays and the closure of the lab. Claudandus would subsequently become a legendary martyr figure revered by the modern-day sect.

Francis gradually traces the neighborhood cats who descended from the strays involved in the experiments and is confronted by Pascal, who reveals himself to be Claudandus. Following Claudandus's murder of Preterius, he was taken in by Preterius's former assistant Ziebold and educated himself on Mendel's laws of heredity. In his pursuits, he saw an opportunity to create a breed of cat that would correspond to the primal ancestor of all domestic cats and be capable of wiping out humanity. The murdered cats, now including Joker, were deemed unworthy of breeding with the pure females that Claudandus had engineered. An additional obstacle in Claudandus's plot is the fact that he is terminally ill with stomach cancer. Although Claudandus deems Francis an ideal successor, Francis defies Claudandus's ambition and attempts to delete the data that Claudandus had gathered. The ensuing fight between the two results in a house fire, and the struggle ends when Francis disembowels Claudandus and leaves him in the burning premises, from which Francis saves himself and an injured Bluebeard.

Cast
Ulrich Tukur as Francis, a tuxedo cat who is new to the district and befriends Bluebeard and Pascal. In the novel, he was a European Shorthair.
Mario Adorf as Blaubart/Bluebeard, a disfigured Maine Coon who spent his childhood in Professor Preterius' lab and befriends Francis at the beginning of his murder investigation.
Klaus Maria Brandauer as Claudandus formerly known as Pascal, an elderly Havana Brown owned by Ziebold, a former associate of Preterius.
Helge Schneider as Jesaja, a Persian cat and self-proclaimed "Guardian of the Dead" who lives in the catacombs underneath the district and receives the bodies of murdered cats.
Wolfgang Hess as Kong, a deformed Himalayan cat who antagonizes Francis until his pregnant mate Solitaire is murdered.
Gerhard Garbers as Professor Julius Preterius, a previous resident of Francis's current home who attempted to create an infallible tissue adhesive by experimenting on local stray cats until he was murdered by a test subject named Claudandus. 
Ulrich Wildgruber as Joker, a Scottish Fold who is the high priest of the Claudandus sect. He allows Claudandus to kill him in order to protect the secrecy of the sect. Later his body was found by Francis.
Mona Seefried as Felicitas/Felicity, a blind Russian Blue who lost her eyesight as a kitten in Preterius' lab and lives in Francis's district.
Manfred Steffen as Gustav Löbel, Francis's owner.
Uwe Ochsenknecht as Archie, Gustav's acquaintance and renovating partner.
Michaela Amler as Nhozemphtekh, a Egyptian mau belonging to an "old and new" breed who seduces Francis.
Christian Schneller as Gregor Mendel, who appears as a figure in Francis's dreams.
Tobias Lelle and Frank Röth as the Hermanns, a pair of Oriental Shorthairs who act as Kong's sidekicks.
Alexandra Mink as Pepeline, Joker's great-granddaughter.

Production 
Felidae was the most expensive animated film produced in Germany to date, reportedly costing 10 million Deutsche Marks, or 5 million US dollars. The characters were designed by Paul Bolger, who also served as a head animator for the film from Dagda Film Limited in Dublin. Armen Melkonian was the film's layout designer and a head animator from the studio Azadart in Toronto. The film was mainly animated by TFC Trickompany in Hamburg, from which Hayo Freitag notably animated the Mendel sequence. The movie was also outsourced to ten animation studios from London to Seoul. Some of the animation was farmed out to other studios, including Animationstudio Ludewig in Hamburg, Uli Meyer Animation in London, Natterjack Animation in Vancouver (from which Steven Evangelatos was the head animator), Mediasoft in Hamburg, Premier Films in London (from which John Cousen was the head animator), A-Film APS in Copenhagen (from which Michael Hegner was the head animator) and Hahn Shin Corporation in Seoul (from which Shin-Mok Choi was the head animator).

Differences from the book 
The character of Bluebeard is more prominent in the film than in the book for the purpose of giving Francis an outside party to relay his thoughts to. Examples of this are the scenes in which Francis meets Jesaja in the catacombs and when he is reading a book on genetics near the story's climax; whereas he is alone for these scenes in the book, Bluebeard accompanies him in the film. The diary from which Francis learns of Professor Preterius's machinations is in written form in the book, and was updated to a video diary for the film. The climactic fight between Francis and Claudandus ends with Francis slitting Claudandus's throat in the book, while in the film, Francis slices Claudandus's abdomen open. The character of Felicity's owner is omitted from the film.

Release 
BMG Video first released the film on VHS in Germany after its theatrical release on November 3, 1994. Although the film has had a cult following, the film failed at the German box office due to poor marketing, as the English version has not been widely released in any English-speaking country (i.e. the United States and the United Kingdom) aside from a hard to find VHS in Australia, possibly due to the movie's strong violence and sexual content. The dub was, however, included on the German and French DVD releases and has since been uploaded in its entirety onto YouTube.

The soundtrack was released on a 16-track CD. The title song Felidae was sung by Boy George and co-written by him with John Themis.

It was released on PAL DVD region 2 with Dolby 5.1 and 2.0 surround sound for the original German audio and Dolby 2.0 for the English audio dub in Dolby 2.0. Extras (in German only) include DVD commentary, trailer in German, and a "making of" documentary.

Reception 
Eric Hansen of Variety said that the film lacked screen time for the plot, and it needed more to avoid confusion. Hansen complimented the voices behind Francis and Bluebeard, but criticized Klaus Maria Brandauer's voice-over as a "by-the-numbers performance."

Soundtrack

Track listing 
 "Felidae" – 04:44 (Boy George/John Themis)
 "Main Theme From Felidae" – 02:06
 "Bluebeard - And Archie" – 01:26
 "Kong And His Cronies" – 02:11
 "Celebrating The Black Mass" – 05:55
 "Felicity" – 01:50
 "Pascal - The Enigma" – 01:37
 "Mendel's Waltz" – 02:39
 "Blood Sport" – 02:17
 "A Gruesome Encounter" – 04:03
 "Catacombs of Doom" – 01:01
 "The Egyptian Dream" – 01:18
 "Seduction NHOZEMPHTEKH" 01:29
 "In The Snow" – 01:14
 "The Riddle Falls into Place" – 05:04
 "I Am Claudandus" – 05:01

References

External links 

 
 
 Trickompany website

1994 films
1994 animated films
German detective films
Animated films about cats
Animated films based on novels
Films about animal cruelty
Films based on German novels
Films set in abandoned houses
1990s exploitation films
German animated films
German crime films
German mystery films
1990s German-language films
Adult animated films
German neo-noir films
Parkour in film
Films scored by Anne Dudley
Films directed by Michael Schaack
1990s German films